Nikki Woodcroft (born 30 January 1996) is a Canadian women's field hockey player.

Playing career

Senior National Team
Woodcroft first represented Canada in 2016, in a test series against the United States. Her first major tournament with the team was the 2017 Pan American Cup, where the team finished fourth.

In 2018, Woodcroft was named in the Canada team for the 2018 Commonwealth Games in Gold Coast, Australia. The team finished fifth in the tournament.

Junior National Team
Woodcroft first represented the junior national team in 2011, at just 15 years old. She continued to represent the team until 2016, at the Junior Pan American Cup.

Personal life

Family
Not only does Nikki play for the Canadian national team, her sister Amanda is also a national representative.

References

External links
 
 

1996 births
Living people
Canadian female field hockey players
Sportspeople from Waterloo, Ontario
Field hockey players at the 2018 Commonwealth Games
Commonwealth Games competitors for Canada